America Salutes Merzbow, subtitled The Lowest Tribute: A Collection of Merzbow Classics as Covered by America's Lowest!, is a 1996 tribute album featuring 23 artists covering various works by Merzbow.

Track listing

References

External links

1996 compilation albums
Tribute albums